David Manson Eggen  (born 1962) is a Canadian politician. He is a Member of the Legislative Assembly of Alberta, in 2019 he was elected as the member representing Edmonton North West. He previously served three terms as the member representing Edmonton Calder from 2004-2008 and then again from 2012-2019. In 2014, Eggen ran in the NDP leadership election, where he placed second. He served as the Minister of Education and Minister of Culture and Tourism in Premier Notley's NDP government from 2015-2019.

Personal life 

Born in 1962, Eggen was educated at the University of Alberta where he received a Bachelor of Education degree in 1984. Eggen then went to Zimbabwe, where he taught for three years, after which he returned to Edmonton, where he taught at local schools from 1990 to 2004. He also coached a wide variety of sports for high school and community teams. In 1996 and 1997, he also served as an education consultant, living and working with the Wat Dhammamongkol Temple in Bangkok, Thailand. He volunteered as an animator at Fort Edmonton Park.

Eggen has worked in health care as an executive director of Friends of Medicare, and was a member of the Canadian Health Coalition’s board of directors. He also acted provincial trustee with the Forum for Young Albertans and a chair leader of the Canadian Paraplegic Association. He was also a member of the Diversity, Equity and Human Rights committee for the Alberta Teachers' Association and an amateur musician. He lives in Edmonton with his wife.

Political career 

Eggen was first elected to the Legislative Assembly of Alberta as a New Democrat in the 2004 Alberta general election, narrowly defeating incumbent Progressive Conservative Brent Rathgeber. He was the first NDP representative elected in Edmonton-Calder since 1993, increasing his party's share of the vote from 18% to 36%. His victory was widely attributed to a two-year canvassing campaign in the run-up to the election. He served as the NDP's critic for Agriculture and Food, Environment, K-12 Education, Sustainable Resource Development, and Tourism and Culture.

He was defeated in the 2008 election by Progressive Conservative Doug Elniski. After this defeat Eggen assumed the Alberta Executive Director's position for Friends of Medicare, an advocacy group that supports public healthcare. Eggen regained his seat in the 2012 provincial election and retained it with a greatly increased margin in the 2015 election.

After the 2015 election Eggen was sworn in as the Minister of Education and as the Minister of Culture and Tourism. He maintained his position as Minister of Education until the 2019 election but was replaced by Ricardo Miranda as Minister of Culture and Tourism.

Electoral history

2001 general election

2004 general election

2008 general election

2012 general election

2015 general election

2019 general election

Cabinet
David Eggen was sworn into Cabinet on May 24, 2015 as part of the NDP government led by Rachel Notley. There had been speculation since the election that Eggen would receive a large portfolio in Cabinet. He was appointed as Minister of Education and Minister of Culture and Tourism.

In fall 2015, Eggen introduced Bill 8, a proposal to reform the collective bargaining structure for public school teachers in Alberta. Bill 8 proposes to introduce a two-table bargaining system, similar to the structure in Ontario, where the provincial government would handle big items like salary and local boards would negotiate local issues. The existing system sees all issues bargained locally.

There was criticism that school boards were not adequately consulted, but documents provided by Eggen's office to the media detailed consultations that had taken place in September and October 2015.

References

Alberta New Democratic Party MLAs
Living people
Canadian people of Norwegian descent
Education ministers of Alberta
Members of the Executive Council of Alberta
Politicians from Edmonton
21st-century Canadian politicians
1962 births